Stuart James Shilson  (born 1966) was the Assistant Private Secretary to Queen Elizabeth II in the Royal Household of the Sovereign of the United Kingdom from 2001 until 2004, before returning to management consultants McKinsey & Company, where he formerly worked.

Previously he had worked for five years as a commercial barrister and for one year on secondment from McKinsey to the Cabinet Office from 1999. Shilson is now a director of McKinsey in London.

Shilson graduated with a first class degree in Mathematics and Philosophy from Balliol College, Oxford, and subsequently obtained an MSc degree in Computer Science from the University of Oxford and an MPhil degree in Law and Criminal Justice from the University of Cambridge.

Shilson was elected a Fellow of the Royal Geographical Society (FRGS) in 1989 and a Fellow of the Royal Society of Arts (FRSA) in 1996. He was appointed as Chairman of Goodenough College in 2020. In 2019, he was commissioned as Deputy Lieutenant (DL) of Greater London.

The master of the Drapers' Company in 2022-3, Shilson also served as Sub Prior of the Most Venerable Order of Saint John from 2013 to 2016 before being made Prior of England and the Islands in March 2022.

Honours 
  – Lieutenant of the Royal Victorian Order (LVO; 2004)
  – Bailiff Grand Cross of the Order of St John (GCStJ; 2013)

References

External links

 

1966 births
Living people
People educated at St Paul's School, London
Alumni of Balliol College, Oxford
Assistant Private Secretaries to the Sovereign
Lieutenants of the Royal Victorian Order
Deputy Lieutenants of Greater London
Bailiffs Grand Cross of the Order of St John
McKinsey & Company people
Fellows of the Royal Geographical Society